Bela-Bela Local Municipality is located in the Waterberg District Municipality of Limpopo province, South Africa. The seat of Bela-Bela Local Municipality is Bela-Bela.

"Bela" is a Sesotho word meaning "to boil", referring to the hot water springs found in the area.

Main places
The 2011 census divided the municipality into the following main places:

Politics 

The municipal council consists of seventeen members elected by mixed-member proportional representation. Nine councillors are elected by first-past-the-post voting in nine wards, while the remaining eight are chosen from party lists so that the total number of party representatives is proportional to the number of votes received. In the election of 1 November 2021 the African National Congress (ANC) won a majority of ten seats on the council.
The following table shows the results of the election.

References

External links 
 Official homepage

Local municipalities of the Waterberg District Municipality